Rudy Garcia-Tolson (born September 14, 1988) is a Paralympic swimmer, runner and triathlete from the USA.

He was born with popliteal pterygium syndrome, resulting in a club foot, webbed fingers on both hands, a cleft lip and palate and the inability to straighten his legs. As a 5 year old wheelchair user, after 15 operations, he decided he would rather be a double amputee and walk with prosthetics. He had both legs removed above the knee.

Swimming

Garcia-Tolson started swimming at age 6. Within a year, the seven-year old was competing against children without disabilities and breaking records.

When he was eight years old, he stated that he would swim in the 2004 Paralympic Games. He was true to his word and won the gold medal in the 200 meter individual medley and broke the world record for his SM7 class.

In the 2008 Beijing Paralympics, when he was 20, he again won the gold medal in the 200 meter individual medley event, breaking his own SM7 world record twice in the process. He also won the bronze medal in 100m breaststroke SB7.

At the 2012 Paralympics in London, he broke the SM7 world record in the 200 meter individual medley heat. In the final, both he and Yevheniy Bohodayko swam faster still. Bohodayko touched the wall first; Garcia-Tolson won silver. He is targeting the 2021 Paralympics in Tokyo.

On April 14, 2022, he was named to the roster to represent the United States at the 2022 World Para Swimming Championships.

Other sports

Athletics

Garcia-Tolson started running at age 7. By the age of 13, he held T42 American Records in all distances from 400 metres to the half marathon.

At the 2011 Parapan American Games, he won a silver medal in the T42 100 metre event. At the 2012 Summer Paralympics, he competed on the track as well as in the pool. He ran personal best times in his T42 100 metre and 200 metre events, but did not qualify for finals.

Triathlon

Garcia-Tolson competed in first his triathlon at age 8, as the swimmer in a winning relay team. He raced with celebrities including Robin Williams as part of Team Braveheart.

At age 10, he completed the first of many individual triathlons.

In 2006, he completed the Ford Ironman World Championship 70.3 in Clearwater, Florida. He attempted the 2009 Ironman World Championship in Kona but missed the bike cut by 8 minutes. Six weeks later, at Ironman Arizona, he became the first double above-knee amputee to complete a full Ironman Triathlon.

Paratriathlon has been included in the program for the 2016 Paralympics. Although he has previously described triathlon as "cross training for swimming", Garcia-Tolson has indicated some interest in competing.

Other Sports

Garcia-Tolson's other activities include karate, skateboarding, as well as kayaking and mountain biking.

Recognition and awards

In 2003, Garcia-Tolson was named one of Teen People Magazine's "20 Teens Who Will Change the World". He was the subject of The Final Sprint's December 2006 "Success Story"; a monthly column that aims to highlight remarkable and factual accounts of runners who have overcome major obstacles and/or changed their lives via running. He has won several awards, including the Arete Courage in Sports Award and the Casey Martin Award from Nike. Following his success at Ironman Arizona, he was nominated for an ESPY Award in 2010.

Personal life

Garcia-Tolson has been a spokesperson for the Challenged Athletes Foundation since 1999.

He is a student at Southwestern College, likes hip hop music and skateboarding, and has one brother and three sisters.

References

External links
 
 Swimmer Rudy Garcia-Tolson – 24 short video clips about Rudy by BP Team USA
 
 
 

1988 births
Living people
American male medley swimmers
Paralympic swimmers of the United States
Swimmers at the 2004 Summer Paralympics
Paralympic gold medalists for the United States
World record holders in paralympic swimming
American amputees
American disabled sportspeople
Sportspeople from Riverside, California
Swimmers at the 2008 Summer Paralympics
Swimmers at the 2012 Summer Paralympics
Athletes (track and field) at the 2012 Summer Paralympics
Paratriathletes of the United States
American male triathletes
Medalists at the 2004 Summer Paralympics
Medalists at the 2008 Summer Paralympics
Medalists at the 2012 Summer Paralympics
Sportspeople with club feet
Paralympic silver medalists for the United States
Paralympic bronze medalists for the United States
Medalists at the 2016 Summer Paralympics
Medalists at the World Para Swimming Championships
Paralympic medalists in swimming
Medalists at the 2011 Parapan American Games
Swimmers at the 2020 Summer Paralympics
S7-classified Paralympic swimmers
21st-century American people